The following is a list of Nippon Professional Baseball players with the last name starting with M, retired or active.

M
Kevin Maas
Takao Mabuchi
Katsumasa Machi
Kojiro Machida
José Macías
Shane Mack
Akihiro Maeda
Daisuke Maeda
Hirotsugu Maeda
Katsuhiro Maeda
Kazuyuki Maeda
Kenta Maeda
Shingo Maeda
Tadatoki Maeda
Takashi Maeda
Tomonori Maeda
Yamato Maeda
Yukinaga Maeda
Hiroyuki Maehara
Katsuhiko Maekawa
Takashi Maema
Takahiro Mahara
Pat Mahomes
Masaki Maki
Akihisa Makida
Hiromi Makihara
Rui Makino
Shogo Makita
Usami Makitani
Kenji Makuta
Jose Malave
Brian Mallette
Mitsuru Manaka
Takashi Manei
Jeff Manto
Barry Manuel
Bobby Marcano
Billy Joe Martin
Domingo Martínez
Luis Martinez
Yoshihiro Maru
Yui Maruki
Eiji Maruo
Taiji Maruyama
Takashi Maruyama
Tatsuyoshi Masubuchi
Daisuke Masuda
Masayuki Masuda
Shintaro Masuda
Natanael Mateo
Kanichi Matoba
Naoki Matoba
Tetsuya Matoyama
Nobuyasu Matsu
Kazuya Matsuda
Masashi Matsuda
Nobuhiro Matsuda
Shinji Matsuda
Heita Matsuhira
Hideki Matsui
Kazuo Matsui
Kosuke Matsui
Takamasa Matsui
Tatsunori Matsui
Takahiro Matsuka
Takahiro Matsukawa
Kenjiro Matsuki
Shingo Matsukubo
Akira Matsumoto
Kodai Matsumoto
Naoki Matsumoto
Shigeru Matsumoto
Shuichiro Matsumoto
Takaaki Matsumoto
Takashi Matsumoto
Takuya Matsumoto
Tetsuya Matsumoto
Tomofumi Matsumoto
Yuichi Matsumoto
Toyoji Matsumura
Hiromi Matsunaga
Hironori Matsunaga
Yukio Matsunaga
Nobuhiko Matsunaka
Daigo Matsuoka
Hiromu Matsuoka
Kenichi Matsuoka
Kenta Matsusaka
Keita Matsushita
Hideyuki Matsutani
Ryujiro Matsutani
Hiroaki Matsuura
Hideaki Matsuyama
Ryuhei Matsuyama
Suguru Matsuyama
Daisuke Matsuzaka
Shingo Matsuzaki
Rob Mattson
Darrell May
Derrick May
Ryu Mayama
Akinobu Mayumi
Scott McClain
Tim McIntosh
Luis Main Medina
Tetsuji Mende
Héctor Mercado
Orlando Merced
Lou Merloni
Hensley Meulens
Bart Miadich
Dan Miceli
Hideyuki Mifune
Osamu Mihara
Shinji Mikami
Hajime Miki
Hitoshi Miki
Masashi Miki
Susumu Mikoshiba
Bob Milacki
Kevin Millar
Justin Miller
Kurt Miller
Mark Mimbs
Toshiyuki Mimura
Kazuaki Minami
Ryusuke Minami
Ryuji Minami
Shinichiro Minami
Tokitaka Minamibuchi
Masataka Minatogawa
Nathan Minchey
Katsuhiro Mino
Takuya Minoda
Damon Minor
Carlos Mirabal
Koichi Misawa
Koji Mise
Terufumi Mishima
Bobby Mitchell
Kevin Mitchell
Tony Mitchell
Yoshitaro Mitoma
Atsuhiro Mitsuhara
Naoki Mitsuhashi
Koji Mitsui
Hidekazu Mitsuyama
Daisuke Miura
Taka Miura
Keiji Miwa
Masayoshi Miwa
Takashi Miwa
Ryuji Miyade
Katsuhiko Miyaji
Kazuhiko Miyakawa
Akira Miyakoshi
Daisuke Miyamoto
Hiroshi Miyamoto (baseball)
Kazutomo Miyamoto
Ken Miyamoto
Kenji Miyamoto
Shinya Miyamoto
Rodrigo Miyamoto-Watanabe
Naoki Miyanishi
Hiroshi Miyauchi
Kazuaki Miyazaki
Michito Miyazaki
Takeshi Miyazaki
Futoshi Miyazato
Daiki Mizuguchi
Eiji Mizuguchi
Hiroshi Mizuhara
Shigeru Mizuhara
Katsuhito Mizuno
Yuki Mizuno
Yoshitaka Mizuo
Nobuaki Mizuochi
Akio Mizuta
Keisuke Mizuta
Hidetsugu Mochizuki
Yukinori Momiyama
Tetsuhiro Monna
Rich Monteleone
Masato Monzen
Trey Moore
Ramón Morel
Choji Mori
Daisuke Mori
Hiroyuki Mori
Koji Mori
Masaaki Mori
Noriyuki Mori
Shigeo Mori
Shinji Mori
Shogo Mori
Masahiko Morifuku
Shigeru Morikasa
Hichori Morimoto
Satoru Morimoto
Katsuya Morinaga
Masao Morinaka
Masahiko Morino
Hiroyuki Morioka
Ryosuke Morioka
Issei Morita
Koki Morita
Akihito Moritani
Hiroshi Moriwaki
Kazuto Moriyama
Makoto Moriyama
Ryoji Moriyama
Kenji Morozumi
Daisuke Motoki
Atsuhiro Motonishi
Kazuya Motoyanagi
Tony Mounce
Lyle Mouton
Yuichiro Mukae
Scott Mullen
Billy Ray Munoz
Seiichi Murakami
Shinichi Murakami
Shinya Murakami
Takayuki Murakami
Tetsuya Murakami
Arihito Muramatsu
Kyohei Muranaka
Tatsuhiko Muranishi
Tetsuyuki Muranishi
Choji Murata
Katsuyoshi Murata
Kazuya Murata
Shinichi Murata
Shuichi Murata
Toru Murata
Yoshinori Murata
Minoru Murayama
Junichiro Mutoh
Takashi Mutoh
Rodney Myers
Aaron Myette

References

External links
Japanese Baseball

 M